Yeo Hoon-min (born August 16, 1991), also known by his stage name Hoon, is a South Korean singer and actor. He is best known as a member of South Korean boy band U-KISS under NH Media. He joined the group in February 2011 after the departure of Alexander Lee Eusebio and Kim Kibum. Hoon currently attends Dongguk University, majoring in theatre and film.

Career

2009–2010: Solo career
Hoon debuted as a solo ballad singer under his real name and released an extended play Pure & Love with  the title track "Bus" on September 9, 2009. The following year, he released a digital single entitled "Beginning". Hoon also appeared in the SBS drama Athena: Goddess of War (2010) as the president's bodyguard.

2011: U-KISS and acting career
After the departure of Alexander and Kibum, NH Media announced that Hoon and Paran's AJ would be joining U-KISS. He made his debut as a member of U-KISS through the group's fifth mini album Bran New Kiss which was released on March 30, 2011, with the title song "0330".

Hoon along with bandmates Dongho, Kiseop and Soohyun began filming a movie with Jay Park, Kim Soo Ro and Park Yejin with the working title Mr. Idol in February 2011. It was the group's first movie. Later that year, it was announced that Hoon and Dongho would star in Super Action TV's Holy Land, a four-part movie about rebellious high school students.

The movie is scheduled to air on April 28, 2012.

In May 2013, Hoon was cast in the Korean musical The Memory 2013 as Eunsoo, a role he shared with singer Brian Joo.

He and Kiseop were also cast for the leading roles of the musical Goong, which is to be held in Osaka from July 11, 2013, to July 15, 2013.

U-KISS Unit with Soohyun 
In 2013, during the U-KISS album promotions of Collage, Hoon performed with fellow member Soohyun on their unit song 'More Painful Than Pain'. In 2021, the unit group will release the song 'I Wish' in both Korean and Japanese.

2016: Japanese solo debut 
On January 16, 2017, it was announced that Hoon would make his Japanese solo debut with an album titled Yukisakura, making him the third member of U-KISS to do so.

2021–present: New agency 
In August 2021, Hoon left NH Media after his contract expired.

On January 24, 2022, Hoon signed an exclusive contract with Tango Music.

Personal life
On May 6, 2022, Hoon announced that he would marry actress Hwang Ji-sun, who will get married on May 29, 2022.

Discography

Extended plays
 Pure & Love (2009)
 Yukisakura (2017)
 Anniversary (2018)

Digital singles
 "Beginning" (2010)

Filmography

Film

TV series

Movies

References

1991 births
Living people
People from Gyeonggi Province
People from Namyangju
South Korean male idols
South Korean male actors
South Korean male television actors
South Korean pop singers
U-KISS members
21st-century South Korean male actors
21st-century South Korean male singers
Republic of Korea Marine Corps personnel